Sunisa Kawrungruang (born 29 January 1972) is a Thai sprinter. She competed in the women's 4 × 100 metres relay at the 1996 Summer Olympics.

References

1972 births
Living people
Athletes (track and field) at the 1996 Summer Olympics
Sunisa Kawrungruang
Sunisa Kawrungruang
Place of birth missing (living people)
Athletes (track and field) at the 1998 Asian Games
Sunisa Kawrungruang
Olympic female sprinters
Sunisa Kawrungruang